Father Time is a studio album from country music artist Hal Ketchum. The album was released on September 9, 2008 on Asylum-Curb Records. It is the follow-up to 2007's One More Midnight, which was only released in the United Kingdom. Father Time is composed of fourteen new songs that were recorded in Curb Studios. "Jersey Girl", a cover of the Tom Waits song, is the only track on the album that Ketchum did not write or co-write.

No singles were released from the album.

Track listing
 "Invisible" (Hal Ketchum, Gary Nicholson) – 3:50
 "Yesterday's Gone" (Ketchum) – 4:06
 "Millionaire's Wife" (Ketchum) – 4:11
 "Million Dollar Baby" (Ketchum, Charlie Kelly, Lynmarie Rink) – 4:58
 "Ordinary Day" (Ketchum, Darrell Scott) – 3:05
 "Continental Farewell" (Ketchum, Jim Reilly) – 3:10
 "Surrounded by Love" (Ketchum) – 2:53
 "The Day He Called Your Name" (Ketchum) – 3:51
 "The Preacher and Me" (Ketchum) – 4:40
 "If You Don't Love Me, Baby (Just Let Me Go)" (Ketchum, Al Anderson) – 3:03
 "Sparrow" (Ketchum) – 4:20
 "Down Along the Guadalupe" (Ketchum) – 4:25
 "Jersey Girl" (Tom Waits) – 3:42
 "Strangest Dreams" (Ketchum, Rivers Rutherford) – 4:58

References

2008 albums
Asylum-Curb Records albums
Hal Ketchum albums